Junior officer, company officer or company grade officer refers to  the lowest operational commissioned officer category of ranks in a military or paramilitary organization, ranking above non-commissioned officers and below senior officers.

The terms company officer or company-grade officer are used more in the Army, Air Force, or Marine Corps as the ranks of captain, lieutenant grades and other subaltern ranks originated from the officers in command of a company or equivalent (cavalry squadron/troop and artillery battery).

In many armed forces, a junior officer is specifically a commissioned officer holding rank equivalent to a naval lieutenant, an army captain or a flight lieutenant or below.

In the United States Armed Forces, the term junior officer is used by the Navy, Coast Guard, Public Health Service, and NOAA Corps for officers in the ranks of chief warrant officer (W-2 to W-4), ensign (O-1), lieutenant (junior grade) (O-2), lieutenant (O-3), and lieutenant commander (O-4).

See also
Enlisted rank
Non-commissioned officer
Officer (armed forces)
Field officer
General officer
Lieutenant grades
Subaltern
Warrant officer

References

Military ranks
Military terminology